Chennai City Football Club is an Indian professional football club based in Coimbatore, Tamil Nadu, which last competed in the I-League, then top flight of Indian football league system, and Chennai Football League. Established in 1946 as Nethaji Sports Club, the club spent its grand majority of history by competing in state leagues and city tournaments until entering the national stage in 2016.

On 11 December 2016, nicknamed The Lions, Chennai City was awarded a direct-entry spot into the I-League for 2016–17 season, and became champion in the 2018–19 season.

History

Formation and early years (1946–2016)
The club was founded in 1946 as Nethaji Sports Club, by five friends, SV Kanagasabai, E Vadivelu, TR Govindarajan, PV Chellappa and K Ekambaram. Nethaji Sports Club, affiliated with Tamil Nadu Football Association (TNFA), has appeared in several state competitions including Vittal trophy, TFA Shield and Chennai District Football League. The club always used to have a young squad with players usually aged 21–22 and the club did come close to national relevance a couple of times, making appearances in the Durand Cup and Federation Cup.

Since the 1990s, Nethaji Sports Club participated in Madras Football League, conducted by Chennai Football Association. In state tournament, Tamil Nadu State League, they finished as runners-up thrice in 2004, 2005–06 and 2007. The club was renamed to Chennai City FC on 11 June 2014.

I-League years (2016–2021)
On 11 December 2016, the club was accepted as a direct entry club for 2016–17 I-League and became the second club from Tamil Nadu to play in the top division after Indian Bank Recreational Club team in National Football League. Chennai City FC made it to the Federation Cup by finishing eighth in the I-League table and did it with a game remaining in the league.

Chennai City did decent in their first season at the highest level of domestic league. Their potential was highlighted when they managed to hold off Mohun Bagan AC for a very long time and even got wins against Aizawl FC and East Bengal FC.

In the 2016–17 Indian Federation Cup, they were pitted in Group A against Aizawl, East Bengal and Churchill Brothers. Chennai City lost their first games and were out of contention before playing the last fixture. The team did salvage pride as they won the game against Churchill Brothers emphatically in a 3–1 victory.

On 6 February 2019, Chennai City FC had agreed for a partnership with Swiss Super League giants FC Basel, which owned 26 percent of the club and would develop football in the state by building football schools for young talents. FC Basel would also have a player exchange program, including first team players, with CCFC and help the club with technical know how.

On 9 March 2019, Chennai City FC beat former champions Minerva Punjab FC 3–1 to be crowned the 2018–19 I-League champions. This marked the finish of a very successful season for the club, defying all expectations to win the league. Spanish-Uruguayan forward Pedro Manzi Cruz also scored a brace in this match, and was the joint top scorer of the league, scoring 21 league goals with record four hat-tricks. This was Chennai City FC's maiden I-League title, and later they represented India at the 2020 AFC Champions League playoffs and 2020 AFC Cup respectively. They also participated in 2019 Sheikh Kamal International Club Cup in Bangladesh, but failed to advance to the knock-out stages.

Chennai City also played in the Hero Super Cup during March–April 2019, and lost in the semi-finals to eventual champions FC Goa. However, they did manage to win 2–1 against ISL champions Bengaluru FC in the quarter finals. In December 2020, Satyasagara appointed as head coach, and the club ended their 2020–21 I-League campaign in ninth place.

Expulsion
In December 2021, the AIFF club licensing committee has unanimously decided to not grant the exemption sought by the club, after having failed to receive the ICLS licence. As a result, Chennai City was barred from participating in the 2021–22 I-League. The club also failed to took part in 2021–22 Chennai Senior Division league.

Sporting license change
On 3 March 2023, the club owner Rohit Ramesh officially announced that the sporting license of Chennai City FC has transferred, and the owners are "out of footballing activities", while retaining the name, rights and logo of the club. Upon transfer of the license to the new licensee, the club will restart footballing activities from the lower divisions of the state league.

Kit manufacturers and shirt sponsors

Stadium

The club played most of its home games at Jawaharlal Nehru Stadium in Coimbatore. Constructed in 1971, it is currently used mostly for football matches and has a capacity of 30,000. Prior to 2017–2018 season, the club played their home matches at the Jawaharlal Nehru stadium in Chennai.

In 2019, the club decided to play their continental matches (AFC Champions League playoffs and AFC Cup) at the EKA Arena in Ahmedabad.

Players

Affiliated clubs

The following club was affiliated with Chennai City FC:
 FC Basel (2019–2020)

Honours

Domestic leagues
 I-League
Champions (1): 2018–19
 Chennai Football League
Champions (2): 2008–09, 2016–17
Tamil Nadu State League
Runners-up (3): 2004, 2005–06, 2007

Notable players
For all former notable Chennai City FC players with a Wikipedia article, see: Chennai City FC players.

Past internationals
The players below had senior international cap(s) for their respective countries. Players whose name is listed, represented their countries before or after playing for Chennai City FC.
 Zohib Islam Amiri (2017)
 Ildar Amirov (2017–2018)
 Murilo de Almeida (2017–2018)
 Veniamin Shumeyko (2017–2018)
 Feiz Shamsin (2018–2019)
 Tenzin Samdup (2018–2019)
 Iqbal Hamid Hussain (2020–2021)

Continental record

Team records

I-League

Key
Tms. = Number of teams
Pos. = Position in league
Attendance/G = Average league attendance
DNP = Did not participate
DNQ = Did not qualify

Overall

Head coach

Team
 Highest transfer fee received – €125,000 plus sell-on clause from J2 League side Albirex Niigata for Pedro Manzi, 2020.

See also
 List of football clubs in India
 Sport in Chennai

Notes

References

Further reading

External links
 Chennai City FC at Global Sports Archive

Chennai City FC at Soccerway
Chennai City FC at the-AIFF.com
Chennai City FC at WorldFootball.net

 
Football clubs in Chennai
Association football clubs established in 1946
1946 establishments in India
I-League clubs